Istanbul Technical University (commonly referred to as ITU or The Technical University) is an international technical university located in Istanbul, Turkey. It is the world's third-oldest technical university dedicated to engineering sciences as well as social sciences recently, and is one of the most prominent educational institutions in Turkey. ITU is ranked 142nd worldwide (1st nationwide) in the field of "Engineering & Technology", and 303rd worldwide (2nd nationwide) in the field of "Natural Sciences" by the QS World University Rankings in 2022. The university has 99 undergraduate, 192 graduate programs, 14 faculties, labs with total 154,000 m2 area, and 12 research centers. The lecturer / student ratio is 1/25.

Acceptance to the university is competitive, and entrance to most of its departments require scoring among the top 1% of nearly 2 million applicants at the national university entrance examination known as "YKS" every year. Graduates of ITU have received many TUBITAK science and TUBA awards. Numerous graduates have also become members of the academy of sciences in the USA, UK and Russia. The university's basketball team, İTÜ BK, is in the Turkish Basketball Super League.

History

Ottoman Empire
Considered as the world's third institution of higher learning specifically dedicated to engineering education, Istanbul Technical University (ITU) has a long and distinguished history. ITU was founded in 1773 by Sultan Mustafa III, as an important institution in the Nizam-ı Cedid reforms, as the Imperial School of Naval Engineering (Mühendishâne-i Bahrî-i Hümâyun), in the Kasımpaşa quarter on the Golden Horn, originally dedicated to train ship builders and cartographers for the Ottoman Navy. In 1795 the Imperial School of Military Engineering was established in the nearby Hasköy quarter on the Golden Horn, and the scope of the school was broadened to train technical military staff for the modernization of the Ottoman Army. In 1845 the engineering function of the school was further widened with the addition of a program devoted to the training of architects. The scope and name of the school were extended and changed again in 1883, and in 1909 the school became a public engineering school which was aimed at training civil engineers who could provide the infrastructure for the rapidly developing country.

Modern Turkey
By 1928 the institution had gained formal recognition as a university of engineering which provided education in both engineering and architecture. In 1944 the name of the institution was changed to Istanbul Technical University and in 1946 the institution became an autonomous university with architecture, civil, mechanical, and electrical engineering faculties.

With its long history of 249 years, its modern teaching environment, and well-qualified teaching staff, Istanbul Technical University today is the personification of engineering and architectural education in Turkey. Istanbul Technical University not only played a leading role in the modernization movement of the Ottoman Empire, but has also maintained its leadership position in the changes and innovations taking place in the construction, industrialization, and technological realms during the modern days of the Turkish Republic. Engineers and architects trained at Istanbul Technical University have played significant roles in the construction of Turkey. Alumni also played a significant role in Turkish politics.

Academics

The structure of faculties, except the Faculty of Science and Letters, at ITU is comparable to those of "schools" in the U.S. institutions, where each faculty is composed of two or more departments in line with a comprehensive engineering field. For example, the Faculty of Electrical and Electronics Engineering consists of the departments of electrical engineering, control engineering, electronics and communication engineering.

Faculty of Civil Engineering
Civil Engineering
Geomatics Engineering
Environmental Engineering
Faculty of Architecture
Architecture
Urban and Regional Planning
Industrial Product Design
Interior Architecture
Landscape Architecture
Faculty of Mechanical Engineering
Mechanical Engineering
Faculty of Electrical and Electronic Engineering
Electrical Engineering
Control Engineering
Electronics and Communication Engineering
 Faculty of Computer and Informatics
Computer Engineering
 Artificial Intelligence and Data Engineering (Undergraduate)
Information Systems Engineering (Joint programme with SUNY)
 Faculty of Mines
Mining Engineering
 Mineral Processing Engineering
Geological Engineering
Petroleum and Natural Gas Engineering
Geophysical Engineering
 Faculty of Chemical and Metallurgical Engineering
Chemical Engineering
 Metallurgical and Materials Engineering
Food Engineering
Bioengineering (UOLP)
 Faculty of Naval Architecture and Ocean Engineering
Naval Architecture and Marine Engineering
Shipbuilding and Ocean Engineering
Faculty of Sciences and Letters
Mathematics Engineering
Physics Engineering
 Chemistry
Molecular Biology and Genetics
 Faculty of Aeronautics and Astronautics
Aeronautical Engineering
Astronautical Engineering
Meteorological Engineering
 Faculty of Management
Management Engineering
Industrial Engineering
Economics
Maritime Faculty
Marine Engineering
Maritime Transportation and Management Engineering
 Faculty of Textile Technologies and Design
Textile Engineering
Fashion Design
Textile Development and Management
ITU-TRNC Education and Research Campuses

 Computer Engineering
 Electrical and Electronics Engineering
 Economics and Finance
 Architecture
 Maritime Business Management
 Maritime Transportation Management Engineering
 Marine Engineering
 Naval Architecture and Marine Engineering
 Preparatory School of Foreign Languages

Institutes and Research Centers
There are several Research Groups in ITU, including:
 Energy Institute
 Institute of Science and Technology
 Social Sciences Institute
 Institute of Informatics
 Eurasia Earth Sciences Institutes
 Molecular Biology, Biotechnology and Genetics Research Center (MOBGAM)
 ARI Technopolis
 Center for Satellite Communications and Remote Sensing
 National Center for High Performance Computing
 Rotorcraft Center of Excellence (ROTAM)
 Mechatronics Education And Research Center (MEAM)
 Center of Excellence for Disaster Management 
 Prof.Dr. Adnan Tekin Materials Science and Production Technologies Applied Research Center (ATARC)
 Housing Research and Education Center
 Women's Studies Center in Science, Engineering and Technology
Planned Research Center Projects:
 Vehicle Technology Research Center
 Rf/Mixed Signal Processing Research Center
 Nanoscience and Nanotechnology Advanced Research Center
Finally, ITU also has the following departments / educational institutes that are not tied to any of the faculties, but serve as independent departments. These include
 School of Foreign Languages
 School of Fine Arts
 School of Athletic Education
 State Conservatory of Turkish Classical Music
 Advanced Musical Sciences Research Institute
 Polar Research Center

International Perspective and Rankings

25 engineering departments of ITU are accredited by Accreditation Board for Engineering and Technology (ABET). Also ITU's Faculty of Architecture is accredited by NAAB and the Faculty of Maritime is accredited by IMO. Minimum score of 79 from TOEFL IBT, or success in the English proficiency exam is one of the prerequisites to register the Bachelor, Master, or Doctorate level courses at ITU. Instruction is both in English and Turkish (roughly 30% and 70%, respectively or 100% in English for some disciplines). Master and Doctorate courses are mostly held in English. ITU is highly reputable institution in the area of engineering sciences within the Europe. Therefore, the university provides a broad range of options, that involve highly reputable institutions, to its students for the Erasmus Mobility.

In the QS World University Rankings 2022, ITU is ranked within the top 200 universities in the subject areas "Engineering - Petroleum", "Engineering - Mineral & Mining", "Engineering - Civil and Structural", "Engineering - Electrical and Electronics", "Engineering - Mechanical", "Engineering - Chemical", "Architecture & Built Environment", and it is ranked within the top 350 universities in the subject areas "Computer Science and Information Systems", "Environmental Sciences", "Material Sciences", "Mathematics", "Physics & Astronomy", "Chemistry".

Campus

ITU is a public (state) university. It has six campuses, five of which are located in the most important areas of Istanbul and one is located in Famagusta. Among ITU's six campuses, the main campus of Maslak, in Sarıyer, is a suburban campus, covering a total area of 2.64 km². The University Rectorate, swimming pool, stadium, along with most of the faculties, student residence halls and the central library of ITU are located there.

Another suburban campus of ITU is the Tuzla Campus. It serves the Maritime Faculty students and faculty members. It is located in the Tuzla district of Istanbul, which is a dockyard area.

The three urban campuses are near to one another and are situated close to Taksim Square.

Taşkışla campus is where the Faculty of Architecture is located. The Taşkışla building is one of the most renowned historical buildings in Istanbul. It dates backs to the Ottoman era and was used as military barracks.

Gümuşsuyu (Mechanical Engineering Faculty) and Maçka (Management Faculty) campuses are also among the important historical buildings of Istanbul.

The Famagusta campus at Northern Cyprus is currently the first and only campus that hosts the ITU-TRNC Education and Research Campuses faculty.

Library Services
 ITU's library roughly holds 533,000 books, 500,000 volumes of book periodicals and 6000 rare Ottoman/Latin books. ITU Library has access to international libraries and online databases. It has the largest collection on technical materials (science and engineering) in Turkey. Mustafa Inan Library named after Mustafa İnan, a former rector of the university, is the central library, the coordination center, of the library services of the Technical University. ITU Library Services' history goes back to 1795, the printing house of the Mühendishâne-i Berrî-i Hümâyun of Ottoman Empire.
 ITU Mustafa Inan Library's Rare Books Collection

Triga Mark-2 Nuclear Reactor
ITU's nuclear reactor of Triga Mark-2 is in the Maslak campus. It is located at the Energy Institute.

Arı Technopolis
Since the foundation in 2003 Arı Technopolis, which is located at the Ayazağa Campus, provides companies with research, technology development and production opportunities at the university, in cooperation with the researchers and academicians. The technopolis have two buildings:Arı-1 and Arı-2. Arı-3 building in Maslak and another building in Floria are announced to build. Arı Technopolis has the 49% of export among technopolises in Turkey.

National High Performance Computing Center
NHPCC, is located in the Ayazağa Campus. It is the national center for high performance computing. The super computer of this center was one of the world's top 500 list super computers (240th).

Student Life

Athletics

Having a suburban campus like Maslak has created the opportunity of building many sports areas. Ayazağa Gymnasium is the center of sports in ITU. Ayazağa Gymnasium also has a stadium with a seating capacity of 3500 for basketball and volleyball matches. A fitness center is also located there.

Basketball matches are among the most important sports activities in ITU. The ITU basketball Team, which won the Turkish Basketball League Championship five times, currently plays in the Turkish Basketball League's Second Division (TB2L). Ayazağa Gymnasium is the home of the ITU Basketball Team.

Despite the successes in basketball, the football team of ITU plays in the amateur league. A football stadium is also located in Ayazağa, where the football team plays its matches.

Tennis courts and an indoor Olympic swimming pool, which is opened in May 2007, are also available in the Ayazaga Campus. An open-air swimming pool serves the ITU faculties.

ITU's American football team ITU Hornets has won the Unilig (Turkish University Sports Leagues) Super League of American football in the 2013-2014 season and in 2014-2015 season.

Other sports clubs/activities in ITU are: Badminton, ultimate, fencing, diving, winter sports, dancing and gymnastics, tennis, paintball, aikido, athletics, mountaineering, bridge, swimming, cycling and triathlon, skiing, parachuting, korfball, handball, iaido, capoeira, wrestling, archery, ultimate frisbee and sailing.

Social life

ITU offers many options to students who like doing extra-curricular work during their studying years. The most popular ones are Rock Club, Cinema Club, Model United Nations, EPGIK, International Engineering Club. Also ITU has an option for those who like to organise events and socialise with people from various European countries in the Local Board of European Students of Technology Group which had 40 members in 2007. Despite all these, it can still be a little quiet in the campus from time to time because students can choose the city of Istanbul over the campus life.

ITU Model United Nations (ITUMUN) 
Model United Nations Society of ITU is one of the most active student clubs in the University. Participating in MUN conferences regularly, both domestic and international, MUN society offers an opportunity for personal development.

Model United Nations is a conference where students participate as United Nations delegates. Participants research and formulate political positions based on the actual policies of the countries they represent.

Housing
ITU dormitories have a capacity of 3,000 students. They include Lakeside Housings, IMKB Dormitory, Verda Urundul, Ayazaga Dormitory and Gumussuyu dormitory. Additional dormitories are planned.

Radio ITU 
Radio ITU (or Technical University Radio) is the first university radio station in Turkey. Radio ITU is located in the School of Electrical and Electronic Engineering building on Maslak campus.

Entertainment
ITU Stadium is one of the most popular locations in Istanbul for concerts and such those performances.

For instance, Metallica (in 2014), Justin Timberlake (in 2014), and Roger Waters (in 2013) gave concerts at the ITU stadium. Lady Gaga also performed at the stadium on September 16, 2014 to a sold-out crowd of 19,157 people as part of her artRAVE: The ARTPOP Ball.

Notable faculty
 Cahit Arf
 Fatih Birol - Economist and Energy expert
 Aykut Barka - Geologist 
 Rudolf Belling - Sculptor
 Ratip Berker - Mechanical engineer
 Nihat Berker - Physicist
 Abdulşahap Cengiz - Art historian
 M. Cengiz Dökmeci - Applied mathematician
 Kerim Erim
 Bülent Evcil - Flutist
 İstar Gözaydın - Political scientist
 Hakan B. Gülsün - Art historian
 Mustafa İnan - Civil engineer-mechanics, Rector
 İhsan Ketin - Geologist
 Y. Doğan Kuban - Architect, historian of architecture
 Emin Halid Onat
 Zekai Şen - Civil engineer, hydrologist
 Erdoğan Şuhubi - Mathematician
 Karl von Terzaghi - Civil engineer, Founder of soil mechanics
 Yusuf Yağcı - Chemist
 Celâl Şengör - Geologist

Notable alumni

Many of the graduates take role in the development of Turkey, with many of them playing significant roles in constructing bridges, roads and buildings. For instance, Emin Halid Onat and Ahmet Orhan Arda are architects of Anıtkabir. Süleyman Demirel (civil engineer) and Turgut Özal (electrical engineer) are the two former presidents of Turkey. Necmettin Erbakan (mechanical engineer) and Binali Yildirim (naval architecture and ocean engineering) were former prime ministers of Turkey.

See also

 Technical university
 Turkish universities
 Top Industrial Managers for Europe (TIME) network of technology universities
 ITUpSAT1, first Turkish university satellite
 CESAER Association
 Education in the Ottoman Empire

Notes and references

External links

 ITU Homepage
ITU Maslak Campus, interactive
 Radio ITU, official website
 Radio ITU Notable people 
 Photos of radio ITU 
 

 
Technical universities and colleges in Turkey
Engineering universities and colleges in Turkey
Şişli
Educational institutions established in 1773
1773 establishments in the Ottoman Empire
Campus, college, student and university radio stations
Istanbul Central Business District